The 1941 Vermont Catamounts football team was an American football team that represented  the University of Vermont as an independent during the 1941 college football season. In their second year under head coach John C. Evans, the team compiled a 2–6 record. The Catamounts also defeated the Montreal Bulldogs 28–13 in an exhibition game played at Percival Molson Memorial Stadium in Montreal on October 15.

Schedule

References

Vermont
Vermont Catamounts football seasons
Vermont Catamounts football